USS Jackson may refer to:

, an  commissioned in 2015

See also
 , a revenue cutter in commission from 1832 to 1864
 , a ballistic missile submarine in commission from 1963 to 1989
 , a steamer in commission from 1863 to 1865
 , a ballistic missile submarine in commission since 1984
 , a steamer in commission from 1862 to 1865
 , a patrol vessel in commission from 1917 to 1918
 , ex-USS PCE(R)-858, a patrol boat which was in commission from 1945 to 1947
 , a sunken cutter which was in commission from 1927 to 1944
 , an attack transport in commission from 1942 to 1955
 , a ballistic missile submarine in commission from 1964 to 1995

United States Navy ship names